Love It Love It is the debut studio album by American indie folk group Nana Grizol. It was released by Orange Twin on May 13, 2008.

Reception
The group was profiled on NPR Music on August 19, 2008, where host Robin Hilton described the album's 11 tracks as:
"...wistful observations on heartache, transient friendships, and the need to bring a little bit more love into the world. It may be a bit too precious for some listeners, but it's uplifting and inspired overall."

Track listing

Credits

Performers
 Jared Gandy – Performer
 Theo Hilton – vocals, electric guitar, acoustic guitar
 Madeline Adams – vocals, bass
 Patrick Jennings – piano, rhodes
 Matte Cathcart – drums
 Laura Carter – trumpet, clarinet
 Margaret Child – glockenspiel, tambourine
 Kate Grace Mitchell – trumpet
 Ian Rickert – clarinet, harmonica

Production
 Jeff Capurso – mastering
 Asa Leffer – engineer
 Sam Phillips – artwork

References

2008 debut albums
Nana Grizol albums